Andrew Peach is a radio presenter in the United Kingdom. He presents a daily news and phone-in show on BBC Radio Berkshire which was named 'Best Local Radio Show in the UK' at the 2021 Radio Academy ARIA Awards. He also presents network programmes such as PM and the Six O'Clock News on BBC Radio 4, Newshour and The Newsroom on BBC World Service and reads news bulletins on BBC Radio 2. Peach celebrated 30 years on BBC Radio on 10th October 2022. He received messages from Theresa May, Zoe Ball, Jane Hill, Jeremy Vine, Tim Davie and Dermot O'Leary.

Life
Andrew Peach was born in Bloxwich and educated at Queen Mary's Grammar School in Walsall and St Edmund Hall, Oxford where he achieved an  MA in Modern History. He lives in Henley-on-Thames, Oxfordshire with his wife and two children. He is patron of Thames Hospice, which runs hospices in Windsor and Ascot.

Career

Peach had early experience being on the radio when he won a competition on BBC WM in 1989. His prize was to travel to Germany and compile reports about life in Bonn and Cologne. His career started at BBC Radio Oxford in 1991. He joined BBC Radio Berkshire in 1992 and presented Saturday Breakfast on both stations from October that year. He began reading the news on BBC Radio 2 in 1998 and is the network's longest serving newsreader. He was the regular news voice on The Chris Evans Show from 2005–9.

Peach hosted Sunday mornings on BBC WM from 2008-2011 and presented programmes on BBC Radio Five Live from 2010-2011. Peach has presented news programmes on BBC World Service since 2011 and on BBC Radio 4 since 2014.

As well as winning gold for Best Local Radio Show at the 2021 Radio Academy ARIA Awards, Peach was nominated as Best Speech Breakfast Presenter in the 2018 ARIAs and UK Speech Broadcaster of the Year in the 2010 Sony Radio Academy Awards. His programmes have been nominated for 16 Radio Academy Awards 2002–2021.
 The judges described him as "an assured host, balancing great seriousness and warmth and displaying a strong bond with his audience” and said “he is empathetic and probing and formulates questions that are short, to the point and perfectly timed.”

Peach's BBC Berkshire show was reviewed by The Guardian in April 2010. His current co-hosts are ex-Reading Captain Ady Williams and former CBBC presenter Kirsten O'Brien.

His interview with the Archbishop of Canterbury in November 2010 was widely reported. His conversation with a tearful Reading FC Captain the morning after the club was relegated from the Premier League was featured in The Times in May 2008. In January 2014, his interview in which a UKIP Councillor blamed recent flooding on gay marriage made news around the world.

Major broadcasts have included coverage of the US Presidential Election in Washington, D.C. in November 2004, Pope Benedict XVI's visit to the United Kingdom in September 2010 and the wedding of the Duke and Duchess of Sussex at Windsor Castle in May 2018. He has hosted BBC coverage of UK General Elections since 2001 and presented the results of the 2016 EU Referendum on BBC World Service.

Peach marked 25 years on BBC Radio on 10 October 2017 with a message of congratulations from Prime Minister Theresa May.

References

External links 
Andrew Peach (BBC Radio Berkshire)

Living people
People from Walsall
British radio personalities
Alumni of St Edmund Hall, Oxford
People educated at Queen Mary's Grammar School
Mensans
Year of birth missing (living people)